Charlotte Spencer may refer to:

Charlotte Spencer, Countess Spencer (1835–1903), wife of the 5th Earl Spencer 
Charlotte Spencer (actress), British actress